Durga Deulkar is an Indian educationist and writer. She is a former director of Lady Irwin College, Delhi (1961–1978). She has written articles and has published books such as A guide to household textiles and laundry work, Household textiles and laundry work and An approach to teaching in the basic schools of India, with special reference to home economics. A recipient of a doctoral degree (PhD) from the Cornell University, USA, Deulkar received the fourth highest Indian civilian award of Padma Shri by the Government of India in 1976.

References

Recipients of the Padma Shri in medicine
Year of birth missing (living people)
Indian women educational theorists
20th-century Indian women writers
20th-century Indian non-fiction writers
Cornell University alumni
Living people
20th-century Indian educational theorists
20th-century women educators